× Renantanda, abbreviated Rntda. in the horticultural trade, is the nothogenus for intergeneric hybrids between the orchid genera Renanthera and Vanda (Ren. x V.). Its parent plants are both endangered, and have separate breeding seasons, so this hybrid is incredibly rare. Because of that, it is highly marketable.

Greges
 Rntda. Lily Aow = V. Pukele × Ren. Storiei – cultured by Boon Kee Aow, the orchid was named after Lee Lee Aow, his eldest daughter

References

http://www.rhs.org.uk/publications/orchidreview/orchid1105/renantanda.asp 

A List of Orchid Hybrids of Singapore and Malaysia, 1960-1980 By V. P. E. Phang

Orchid nothogenera
Aeridinae